The Durango Institute of Technology (in ) is a Mexican public university located in the state of Durango.

References

Technical universities and colleges in Mexico
Public universities and colleges in Mexico
Universities and colleges in Durango
Educational institutions established in 1948
1948 establishments in Mexico
Durango City